Shaikham is a village in Punjab, Pakistan, also known as Shaikham Kalan to distinguish it from Shaikham Khurd to the northeast. It is a part of Pattoki Tehsil in Kasur District.

Nearest cities  
Raiwind  42 km,
Okara  45 km,
Jaranwala City  53 km,
Kasur  58 km,
Junubi Lahore (South Lahore)  60 km,
Lahore  70 km,
Shaikhupura  77 km,
Shumali Lahore (North Lahore)  77 km,
Mashriqi Lahore (East Lahore)  80 km,
Muridke  93 km,

Populated places in Kasur District